Karel Průša (1938–2019) was an international speedway rider from Czechoslovakia.

Speedway career 
Průša reached the final of the Speedway World Team Cup in the 1962 Speedway World Team Cup.

World final appearances

World Team Cup
 1962 -  Slaný (with Bedřich Slaný / Bohumír Bartoněk / Jaroslav Volf / Luboš Tomíček Sr.) - 4th - 16pts (2)

References 

1938 births
2019 deaths
Czech speedway riders